Mount Albert Grammar School, commonly known as MAGS, is a co-educational state secondary school in Mount Albert in Auckland, New Zealand. It teaches students in year levels 9 to 13. , Mount Albert Grammar School is the second largest school in New Zealand, behind Rangitoto College.

History
Mount Albert Grammar was founded in 1922 as a subsidiary of Auckland Grammar School, but now the two schools are governed separately. Mount Albert Grammar School was originally boys only, but became co-educational in 2000. Junior classes (years 9 and 10) are mostly single-sex while senior classes (years 11 to 13) are all co-educational.

There have been a number of headmasters since the opening of the school, Frederick Gamble (1922–1946), William Caradus (1946–1954), Murray Nairn (1954–1969), Maurice Hall (1970–1988), Gregory Taylor (1988–2006, the first Albertian to become Headmaster), Dale Burden (2006–2015), and the current headmaster, Patrick Drumm (2016–).

The school's hall was opened on 11 March 1926 by Sir James Parr after construction during 1925.

After the opening of the school, a need for boarding accommodation for students became apparent. In 1927, the Mount Albert Grammar School Hostel opened for boarders at 807 New North Road. This hostel closed in 1970 and a new one was opened in 1971, built on one of the school's playing fields. This is a boys' boarding hostel called School House. It has full-time accommodation for up to 105 students during school terms.

The School's Latin motto is Per Angusta Ad Augusta, which means  "Through Hardship to Glory". The school hymn, sung at all formal assemblies, was written by a student, J. A. W. Bennett, in 1928.

In October 2015, an email containing a pornographic image was sent to all the school's 2,700 students after the school's email database was reportedly hacked by one of the school's students. The email database was immediately shut down and an investigation was started into who was responsible. The school laid a complaint with police and sought the assistance of the Department of Internal Affairs.

The school purchased what was meant to be a girls' hostel, but due to the Auckland housing crisis turned into accommodation for teachers. The complex is located 6 minute walk away from MAGS on Lloyd Avenue.

On July 24, 2020, Prime Minister Jacinda Ardern officially opened the school's new science block, known as CS block and honouring the school's second headmaster, William Caradus. This was set to take place on March 24, however was postponed due to the COVID-19 pandemic. The block has been in use since classes commenced for the 2020 school year.

Academia
Mt Albert Grammar School pupils participate in various forms of academia, from year 9 to year 13.

In 2015, 93.8 percent of students leaving Mount Albert Grammar held at least NCEA Level 1, 87.7 percent held at least NCEA Level 2, and 67.8 percent held at least NCEA Level 3. This is compared to 88.4%, 79.1%, and 52.8% respectively for all students nationally.

Sports
In 2007 and 2009 MAGS won all the major Auckland titles in rugby, association football and netball. The First XI girls football and the Premier Girls Basketball also won their first Auckland Championships in 2009.

In 2008, one sports staff member and a parent coach were suspended by the schools' sport body College Sport and nine students who had transferred to the school were prevented from playing by rules designed to prevent poaching of young players. As a result, the school implemented a sporting Code of Conduct for all students, staff and coaches. This ultimately led to the dismissal of Director of Football, Kevin Fallon.

Mt Albert Aquatic Centre
The Mt Albert Aquatic Centre was developed as a joint project between Mount Albert Grammar School and the Auckland City Council. It was officially opened by the Prime Minister of New Zealand in 1998. The facility contains a 25-metre competition pool with depths measuring from 1.2 metres to 3 metres, and a leisure pool that features wave motion and a water slide. The complex consists of other features visited by the public often. However, in 2016 the pool was noted to be unsafe due to its vulnerability to earthquakes. The pool is set to be either fixed or demolished in the next ten years.

Mount Albert Grammar School Farm

Since 1933 Mount Albert Grammar School has a  farm adjacent to its school site in the middle of Auckland city. It is a fully working model farm, home to sheep, pigs, rabbits, cattle and poultry, cared for by a farm manager who lives on site. The land is owned by the ASB Bank, which in 2013 extended the school's lease costing 1 dollar every year for 99 years, taking the ownership through to 2112.

Students are able to study Agricultural Science from Year 10 onwards, and also travel to farms and agricultural training centres for day trips and camps. They attend Field Days at Mystery Creek each year and some students are selected to assist in the agricultural area of the Auckland Easter Show.
 
As well as a classroom the farm has a one-stand wool shed with wool-handling facilities, pens to hold 150 sheep overnight, a two-stand walk-through milking shed with milking plant, an implement shed and a unit for small animals.

Observatory
The school is one of a few schools in New Zealand with an active observatory and possesses a telescope open to students and the public occasionally. Completed in 2008, the observatory has a Meade Instruments LX200R 12-inch Schmidt-Cassegrain f/10 telescope. The observatory uses an SBIG ST7XME CCD camera for imaging and photometry.

The observatory is used for both school education and amateur research.

School Hymn 
The school hymn is sung at all formal school assemblies, normally accompanied by live piano. It was written by MAGS student Jack A. W. Bennett in 1928. The lyrics to the hymn were analysed in a report written by Brian Murphy, the School Archivist.

ERO report
In 2018, the New Zealand Education Review Office carried out a survey, finding that the school uses National Certificate of Educational Achievement and celebrates its students achievements through the Lion Awards programme. Its educational achievement level is above the national average, making   Mt Albert Grammar one of the top seven schools in the country. The ethnic minorities of the school have shifted the balance since the 2015 review. By that, 91% of Māori and 85% of Pacific students gained NCEA Level 2 in 2017.

The school enrolls 2991 students, out of which 57% are male and 43% are female. Out of those, 40% are of European descent, 23% are Asian, 19% are identified as Pacific Islanders, 3% are MELAA and 2% are of other ethnicity.

Notable alumni

Notable alumni include:

Academia
Michael Bassett, QSO, NZ Medal – former senior lecturer in history at the University of Auckland 1964–1978. J B Smallman Professor of History at the University of Western Ontario 1992–1993. Former MP and Cabinet Minister
J.A.W. (Jack) Bennett – former Chair of Medieval and Renaissance English at Cambridge University, 1964–1978. Fellow of the British Academy 1971
Sir Graeme Davies, KBE – former Vice-Chancellor of three universities: the University of London, the University of Glasgow, and the University of Liverpool
Richard Dell – Scientist
Peter C. B. Phillips – Professor of Economics at Yale University
Sir Keith Sinclair – New Zealand historian
Professor Karl Stead ONZ CBE – poet, novelist and literary critic

Art
Sir Peter Siddell
Derek Hansen – writer
Len Castle - potter

Entertainment 

 Liam Thompson - YouTube personality

Government
Dr Alan Bollard – Governor of the Reserve Bank of New Zealand
Sir Robert Muldoon – Prime Minister of New Zealand 1975 – 1984
Mac Price – Diplomat

Industry
Sir Woolf Fisher – Co-Founder of Fisher & Paykel
Chris Liddell – Former Chief Financial Officer at both Microsoft and General Motors, now Chairman of Xero
Sir Daniel James Matthews – Former Chairman of the BNZ
Sir Alexander Ross – London banker, chair ANZ Bank, former NZ Reserve Bank deputy governor and former chairman British Commonwealth Games Federation

Law
Judge Mick Brown – former Principal Youth Court judge. Past Chancellor of the University of Auckland 1986–1991

Music
Sir Donald McIntyre – opera singer

Public service
G. S. Carter DSO – Z Special Unit commando and founder of Kundasang War Memorial and Gardens
Les Mills – Former Mayor of Auckland and athlete
Sir Robert (Bob) Mahuta – Commissioner of the Treaty of Waitangi Fisheries Commission. Chairman Maori Development Corporation.
Hon. Justice Charles Cato – former Rhodes Scholar, former high-profile Auckland barrister, current Supreme Court Judge of the Kingdom of Tonga (since May 2012).

Religion
Reverend Brother Michael J. Foran (1948–2000) – founder of a Catholic religious community, the Mother of God Brothers

Science
E.G. (Ted) Bollard – former Research scientist at DSIR 1948–1980 and director of the horticulture and processing division. Pro-chancellor of The University of Auckland, 1989–1991
Sir Alan Stewart, KBE, CBE – former vice-chancellor of Massey University 1964
Richard Matthews, Order of New Zealand (1988), Hector Medal of Royal Society of New Zealand, FRSNZ, FNZIC, FRS – Former Chairman of Toxic Substances Board, Health Department. Former President NZ Microbiological Society.

Sports

Andrew Blowers – Former All Blacks player, also played for Auckland Blues, Northampton Saints, Bristol in the Guinness Premiership
Michael Boxall – 2008 Summer Olympics participant and former member of New Zealand U-23 football team
Caleb Clarke - All Black
Mick Bremner – Former All Blacks player
Mark Brooke-Cowden – Former All Blacks player
Olo Brown – Former All Blacks player
Ronald Bush – Former All Blacks player
Bruce Culpan (1930–2021), rower
Richard de Groen – Test cricketer and Olympic and Commonwealth Games administrator
Maria Folau – Netball player for New Zealand Silver Ferns
Jack Goodhue – All Blacks player, also plays for the Canterbury Crusaders and has represented New Zealand in Rugby Sevens and Under 20s
James Goulding – Former Kiwis player
Rod Heeps – Former All Blacks player
Adam Henry – rugby league player for the Sydney Roosters
Kai Kara-France – mixed martial artist, UFC Flyweight division 
Sam Kasiano – rugby league player for Canterbury Bulldogs and New Zealand national rugby league team
Lucas Knecht – Represented Northern Mariana Islands national football team, youngest ever international footballer
Fred Ah Kuoi – Represented New Zealand national rugby league team
Tevita Latu – Represented New Zealand national rugby league team, also represents the Tonga national rugby league team
Thomas Leuluai – Represented New Zealand national rugby league team
Steven Luatua – Former All Blacks player
Arthur Lydiard ONZ – world-renowned Athletics coach
Steve Matai – rugby league player for Manly Sea Eagles and New Zealand national rugby league team
Sam McKendry – rugby league for Penrith Panthers and New Zealand national rugby league team
Les Mills – Represented New Zealand at Olympic Games and Commonwealth Games over two decades
Albert Nikoro – rugby union player for Western Force
Shane O'Brien – 1984 Olympic rowing gold medallist
Arun Panchia – Hockey player for Black Sticks
Matthew Ridge – Former All Blacks, and rugby league captain for the Manly Sea Eagles, New Zealand Warriors and Kiwis
Ray Sefo – Boxer and K-1 Kick Boxer
Peter Snell – Olympic gold medalist – Athletics
Dave Solomon – Former All Blacks player
Malo Solomona – former professional rugby league footballer for New Zealand Warriors
Se'e Solomona – Represented New Zealand national rugby league team
Joe Stanley – Former All Blacks player
Peter Thorburn – Former Rugby Union Player, died in 2021.
Ron Urlich – Former All Blacks player
Giff Vivian – Test cricketer
Graham Vivian – Test cricketer
Sean Wainui - Māori All Black representative rugby union player
Bryan Williams – Former All Blacks player
Sonny Bill Williams – rugby league player for the Sydney Roosters, Represented New Zealand national rugby league team, All Blacks and is a heavyweight boxer
Portia Woodman – New Zealand women's national rugby union team (sevens)

See also
List of schools in New Zealand

References

External links

Te Kete Ipurangi School Profile

Boarding schools in New Zealand
Astronomical observatories in New Zealand
Educational institutions established in 1922
Secondary schools in Auckland
Heritage New Zealand Category 2 historic places in the Auckland Region
1922 establishments in New Zealand